Contact Air Flugdienst was a German regional airline from Filderstadt. With flight operations based at Stuttgart Airport, it operated scheduled passenger flights under the Lufthansa Regional brand.

History
The airline was founded in 1974 as a tax-break by Gunter Eheim, a German World War II test pilot and later manufacturer of aquarium filters, initially operating chartered passenger services using a small fleet of Dassault Falcon 20 and Learjet aircraft. In 1981, Contact Air became one of the launch customers for the British Aerospace Jetstream, along with US carrier Mall Airways. Its first aircraft of that type was delivered in the following year.

In 1984, Contact Air was subcontracted by DLT to operate one of its Jetstreams on scheduled regional flights on behalf of Lufthansa. Subsequently, DLT acquired 24.8 percent of the Contact Air shares.

Having waged the alternative of ordering the ATR 42, Contact Air announced in 1986 that it had chosen the de Havilland Canada Dash 8-100 for a fleet enlargement, thus becoming the second European airline to operate that type, after Tyrolean Airways. Two years later, Contact Air became the first non-Canadian buyer of the stretched Dash 8-300 version, ordering three aircraft worth $35 million.

In April 1996, Contact Air became a founding member of Team Lufthansa. In 2004, this airline association was reorganized as Lufthansa Regional, a Star Alliance affiliate. Henceforth, all Contact Air flights were operated using the Lufthansas branding and flight numbers.

On 29 November 2011, it was reported that Lufthansa would terminate its contract with Contact Air effective 1 October 2012. At that time, the Contact Air fleet consisted of eight Fokker 100, six of which were operated on behalf of Lufthansa out of Stuttgart Airport, with another two being based at Zurich Airport and operated for Swiss International Air Lines. In May 2012, Contact Air agreed to be taken over by OLT Express Germany, a step which was finalized in September of that year following its approval by the Federal Cartel Office.

Corporate affairs
Prior to acquisition the headquarters were in Filderstadt. Previously they were in Stuttgart.

Destinations 

The scheduled destinations that were served by Contact Air on behalf of Lufthansa included:

Fleet development
Over the years of its existence, Contact Air operated the following aircraft types:

Incidents and accidents

On 6 January 1993, Lufthansa Flight 5634 from Bremen to Paris, which was carried out under the Lufthansa CityLine brand using a Contact Air Dash 8-300 (registered D-BEAT), crashed  short of the runway of Paris-Charles de Gaulle Airport. Four out of the 23 passengers on board died; the four crew members survived. The accident happened as a result of a failed go-around, which had become necessary because the aircraft ahead, a Boeing 747 of Korean Air, had suffered a blown tyre upon landing and the runway had subsequently been closed.
On 14 September 2009, Lufthansa Flight 288 from Berlin to Stuttgart, which was operated by a Contact Air Fokker 100 registered D-AFKE, made an emergency landing at Stuttgart Airport at 10:47 local time due to undercarriage failure. There were no injuries amongst the five crew members and 73 passengers on board. In the media coverage following the accident, Contact Air was criticised for operating ageing Fokker 100 aircraft, some of which previously had belonged to an airline that had been banned from European airspace over safety concerns.
One of Contact Air's former Fokker 100 aircraft crashed in Kazakhstan as Bek Air Flight 2100 on December 27, 2019, killing 12.

References

External links

 Contact Air (Archive)

Defunct airlines of Germany
European Regions Airline Association
Airlines established in 1974
Airlines disestablished in 2012
1974 establishments in West Germany
Lufthansa
Companies based in Stuttgart
German companies established in 1974
German companies disestablished in 2012